Pakanit Boriharnvanakhet (born 22 July 1949) is a former Thai cyclist. He competed in four events at the 1968 Summer Olympics.

References

1949 births
Living people
Pakanit Boriharnvanakhet
Pakanit Boriharnvanakhet
Cyclists at the 1968 Summer Olympics
Pakanit Boriharnvanakhet
Pakanit Boriharnvanakhet